All The Way Up is a 1970 British comedy film directed by James MacTaggart based on Semi-Detached, a 1962 play by Midlands dramatist David Turner. It stars Warren Mitchell, Pat Heywood, Kenneth Cranham, Richard Briers, Adrienne Posta and Elaine Taylor.

The title song was performed by Liverpool group The Scaffold.

Plot
A social climbing father uses everything from poison pen letters to blackmail in order to gain promotion and wealth for his children through marriages.

Cast
Warren Mitchell - Fred Midway 
Pat Heywood - Hilda Midway 
Elaine Taylor - Eileen Midway 
Kenneth Cranham - Tom Midway ww
Vanessa Howard - Avril Hadfield 
Richard Briers - Nigel Hadfield 
Adrienne Posta - Daphne Dunmore 
Bill Fraser - Arnold Makepiece 
Terence Alexander - Bob Chickman
Maggie Rennie - Mrs. Chickman
Frank Thornton - Mr. Driver

Certification
The film is rated M in New Zealand for sex scenes and sexual references.

References

External links 
 
 

1970 films
1970 comedy films
British comedy films
1970s English-language films
British films based on plays
EMI Films films
Films scored by Howard Blake
1970s British films